The Mayor of Aosta/Aoste is an elected politician who, along with the Aosta's City Council, is accountable for the strategic government of Aosta, the regional capital of Aosta Valley, Italy. The current Mayor is Gianni Nuti, a centre-left independent, who took office on 6 October 2020.

Overview
According to the Italian Constitution, the Mayor of Aosta is member of the City Council.

The Mayor is elected by the population of Aosta, who also elect the members of the City Council, controlling the Mayor's policy guidelines and is able to enforce his resignation by a motion of no confidence. The Mayor is entitled to appoint and release the members of his government.

Since 1995 the Mayor is elected directly by Aosta's electorate: in all mayoral elections in Italy in cities with a population higher than 15,000 the voters express a direct choice for the mayor or an indirect choice voting for the party of the candidate's coalition. If no candidate receives at least 50% of votes, the top two candidates go to a second round after two weeks. The election of the City Council is based on a direct choice for the candidate with a preference vote: the candidate with the majority of the preferences is elected. The number of the seats for each party is determined proportionally.

Duchy of Savoy (until 1416) 
 
 1333 - Léonard de Villa - Viorin Boverie - Gilles de Chevrères - Brunet du Fosse - Vuillerme Tropel
 1351 - Henry d'Oscano et Jean Valcarier (Mauconseil) - Raymond Jéremie et Jean Bergerii (De bicheria) - Hugonet de Arlio et Jean Avilié (De Porta Sancti Ursi)
 1353 - Pierre Rulliardy - Jean Pollet - Jean de Rovereto (De Bicheria)
 1356 - Bertrand de Gotorosi et Antoine de Pallen (De Bicheria) - Hugonet De Arlio et Bernard Pociolaz (Mauconseil) - Pierre de Palatio et Pierre Gonteret (De Porta Sancti Ursi)
 1360 - Hugonet De Arlio
 1401 - Jean Mayneti - Jean Malluquin

Kingdom of Sardinia (from 1416 to 1860) 
 
 1428 - Urbain de Léaval
 1436 - Claude Vaudan - Georges Taridan
 1439 - Hugonet de La Tour - Martin Pignet
 1443 - Scano De Pallen - Antoine Bérard
 1457 - François Rulliardy - Jean de Reymondis
 1460 - Boniface de La Tour - Jean Verchy
 1467 - Jean Tharida - Barthélemy Ducis
 1471 - Jean Meynet - Jean de Roveria
 1472 - Pierre Dubois - Pierre de Rovarey
 1481 - Guillaume Dubois - Jean de Horto
 1487 - Louis Saluard - Boson Laurensety
 1503 - Jean Alexonc - Jean Béatrice
 1505-1506 - Boniface de Tollen - Jean de Marcenasq
 1512 - Jean Pensa - Jacques Mugnery - Jean Ottin 
 1513 - Jean Chamin - Jacques Mugnéry
 1514-1515 - Claude Mistralis - Marcel du Prez
 1516 - Jacques Bernardi - Jean Cathérelly
 1528 - Nicolas-François Guichardy - Jean de Près
 1529 - Jean Saluard - Jean Ottin
 1530 - François Jacquemody - Jean Gueuillardy
 1531 - Antoine de Bosses - Antoine de Pré
 1532 - Pierre Fabri - Antoine Bufantan
 1533 - François la Crête - Antoine Caterel
 1534 - Denys Arragonis - Jean de Canaly
 1535 - Jean Martinet - Jean Maguet 
 1536 - Pantaléon Ottini - Pantaléon Berthody
 1537 - Jean-François Vaudan - Jean Bianquin
 1538 - Jean-Francois Beillety - Jean Galli
 1539 - Michel Saluard - Sulpice Milliéry
 1540 - Antoine Vaudan - Jean Passerin
 1541 - Barthélemy Lachériety - François Bianquin
 1542 - Antoine De Bertharinis - Claude Bocheti
 1543 - Jean de Pensa - Humbert Catherel
 1544 - Jean de Rou - Antoine Vaudan
 1545 - Michel Guichardy - Pierre Puppon
 1546 - Barthélemy de Carreria - Pantaléon Camin
 1547 - Pantaléon Pépolin - Grat Berthui
 1549 - François Bornyon - François Gilliet
 1550 - René Lostan - Sulpice Gorra
 1551 - Nicolas Bandelli - Pantaléon Clauselina
 1552 - Jean Quey - Pierre Gerliery
 1553 - Pierre de Berthaz - Jean André
 1554 - Pantaléon Vaudan - Jean Saluard
 1555 - Jean Malliet - Grat Duc
 1556 - Claude Excoffieri - Rou Goillard
 1557-1559 - Nicolas d'Avise - Claude Saluard
 1560-1561 - Bonaventure Vaudan - Pierre Foldon
 1562 - Jean Tillier - Martin Nigri
 1563 - André Fuaz - Étienne Sourelley
 1564 - Jean Cerise - Sulpice Martinet
 1565 - Pierre Roncassi - Nicolas Menet Saluard
 1566 - Jean-Martin Fuaz - Antoine Meynet
 1567 - Leonard des Bosses - Hyblet Foldon
 1568 - Pierre Saluard - Sébastien Sattenin
 1569 - Jean-Boniface Malliet - Barthélemy de Pré
 1570 - François la Grive - Étienne Batiany
 1571 - Claude Quay - Guillaume Jacquenin
 1572 - Mathieu Pensa - Guillaume Jacquenin - Jean Savini
 1573 - Bening La Chériety - Antoine Gal
 1574 - Antoine Bérard - Martin Bazelly
 1575 - François Poncet - Jean Pessin
 1576 - Sulpice Varineis - Jean de Pré
 1577 - Antoine-Philibert Regis - Ayme André
 1578 - Thibaud de Valette - Barthélemy Clavel
 1579 - Mathieu Defeyes - Jean Ravet
 1580-1581 - Marcel Sebrié - Vincent Ottiné
 1582 - Hilaire Pointiers - Louis Bianquin
 1583 - Bonaventure-Philibert Bournyon - Pierre Chanvillair
 1584 - Grat Philippon - Eusèbe Munier
 1585 - Grat Philippon - Nicolas Peclet
 1586 - Pierre Saluard - Jean-Pantaléon Bussautan
 1587 - Nicolas Tillier - Étienne Favre
 1588 - François Aymonety - Léger Milliéry
 1589 - Grat Bertharin - Louis Avoiat
 1590 - Étienne Pépelin - Jean Milliet - Pantaléon Malliet
 1591 - Jean-Antoine la Crête - Vincent Jeantet - Antoine Foldon
 1592 - Philippe Cerise - Jean-Barthélemy Saluard
 1593 - Claude Dunoyer - Pantaléon Cantamot
 1594 - Antoine Bérardy - Jean Malliet
 1595 - Marc Carlin - Claude Poignendy
 1596 - Pantaléon la Chériète - Jean-Antoine Gorra
 1597-1598 - François Carabel - Jean Grimod
 1599 - Jean-Jacques Malliet - Nicolas Saluard
 1600 - Rolland Giavin - Antoine Gilliet
 1601 - Jacques Bérard - Michel De Vevey
 1602 - Pantaléon Buthod - Barthélemy Pasteur
 1603 - Philibert Saluard - Jean-Guillaume Martinet
 1604 - Philibert Saluard - Pierre Chanvillair
 1605 - Jean-François Cuchat - François Cornillon La Valleta
 1606 - André Marcoz - Pierre Marcoz
 1607 - Jean Remondé - Jean-Barthélemy Martinet
 1608 - Jean-Pierre Jeantet - Barthélemy Pomat
 1609 - Vincent la Cheriette - François Chanvillair
 1610 - Vincent la Cheriette - Jules-Phèbe Gilliet
 1611 - Barthélemy Vignettaz - Michel de Collin
 1612-1613 - André Savin - Sulpice Derriard
 1614 - Jean-François Tillier - Jean-Jacques Passerin
 1615 - Claude Gaberand - Étienne Dossan
 1616 - Jean-François Decré - Étienne Dossan
 1617 - Philibert Giavin - Laurent Favale
 1618 - Georges de Grandes - Jean-François Lostan - Jean-Antoine Gal
 1619-1620 - Jean-François Lostan - Jean-Antoine Gal
 1621-1623 - Nicolas Besenval - Guillaume Mochety
 1624 - Pierre Savin - André Bianquin
 1625-1627 - Jean-Balthasard Pascal - François Poignendy
 1628 - Jean-Nicolas Désaymonet - Gennin Lantamot
 1629 - Jean Milliet - Étienne-Philibert Dunoyer
 1630 - Jean Milliet - Pierre Blanc - Nicolas Bovety - Étienne-Philibert Dunoyer
 1631 - Nicolas Bovety - Étienne-Philibert Dunoyer
 1632 - Jean-Antoine Jeantet - Jean-Jacques De Pléoz
 1633-1634 - Hugonet Derivoz - Jean-Jacques De Pléoz
 1635 - Pierre Cossard - Jacquemet Fleur
 1636 - Pantaléon Buthier - Antoine du Vevey
 1637 - Louis Pomat - Antoine Charvoz
 1638 - Laurent Vuillet - Antoine Gal
 1639 - Jean-Vincent la Chériette - Jean-François Passerin
 1640-1641 - Philibert Aymonier - Antoine Martini
 1642 - Jean-Baptiste Bertoz - Antoine Martini
 1643 - Mathieu Decré - Jean-Claude Mochety
 1644-1645 - Mathieu Decré - Claude-François Bettety
 1646 - Barthélemy Gogioz - Grat-Philippe Gaberand
 1647 - Grat-Philippe Gaberand - Jean Bétemps
 1648 - Jean Passerin - Jean Parise - Nicolas-Gaspard Peclet
 1649 - Jean Parise - Antoine des Chenaux
 1650 - Vuillen Tissioret - Claude Martini
 1651 - Marc-Antoine Decré - Michel Martinet
 1652 - Sulpice Derriard - Jean-Pierre Pontey
 1653 - Jean-Antoine Ducloz - Jean-Pierre Pontey
 1654 - Jean-Antoine Ducloz - Claude Pomat
 1655 - Érasme Passan - Martin Vuillen
 1656 - Claude Mollier - Martin Vuillen
 1657 - Claude Mollier - Jean-Claude Peclet
 1658-1660 - Jean-Boniface Festaz - Jean Camos
 1661-1662 - Pierre Passerin - Jean-Baptiste Galeux
 1663 - Mathieu Viettes - Louis Réan
 1664-1665 - Cyprien Pascal - Nicolas Revel
 1666-1667 - Grat Meilleur - Philibert-Amé Arnod
 1668-1669 - Jean-Balthasard La Crête - Francois-Jérôme Francon
 1670-1671 - Jean-Gaspard Bolossier - Pierre Viérin
 1672 - Antoine Petitjacques - Pantaléon des Chenaux
 1673-1675 - Germain Jourdan - Jean-Pierre Buillet
 1676-1677 - Jean-Michel Passerin - Jean-Louis Passerin
 1678 - Germain Diémoz - Jean-Joseph Lyboz
 1679-1681 - Jean-Claude Pascal - Claude-Anselme Dunoyer
 1682 - Jean-Pantaléon Valettaz - Martin Gonraz
 1683 - Érasme-Nicolas Viettes - Martin Gonraz
 1684-1686 - Jean-Baptiste Figerod - Aymé Hugonin
 1687 - Jean Bus - Humbert Peclet - Pierre Viérin
 1688 - Jean Bus - Pierre Viérin
 1689 - Jean Bus - Pantaléon Noir
 1690 - François Gogioz - Pantaléon Noir
 1691 - Jean-André Curard - Jean-Pantaléon Noir
 1692 - Jean-Antoine Millet - Jean-Rhémy Tillier
 1693-1694 - Jean-Antoine Michelet - Jean-Rhémy Tillier
 1695 - Jean-Jacques Ducloz - Jean Porliod
 1696-1698 - Jean-Antoine Blanc - Jean-Georges Pépelin
 1699 - Barthélemy Ubertin - Jean-Antoine Perlaz
 1700 - Barthélemy Ubertin - Jean-Louis Perinod - Jean-Antoine Perlaz
 1701 - Jean-Louis Périnod - Jean-Antoine Perlaz
 1702 - Jean-Christophe Bertaz - Jean-Baptiste Vercellin
 1703 - Jacques Bioley - Jean-Baptiste Vercellin
 1704 - Jean-André Milet - Jean-François Droz
 1705-1706 - Jean-Pantaléon Vivier - Jean-François Droz
 1707 - Jean-Pierre Empereur - Jean-Dominique Biancoz
 1708 - Jean-Joconde Rotaz - Jean-Dominique Biancoz
 1709 - Pierre-Joseph Droz - Charles-Emmanuel Rovéyaz
 1710 - Nicolas Bufloz - Charles-Emmanuel Rovéyaz
 1711 - Jean-Pierre Burgay - Charles-Emmanuel Roveyaz
 1712-1713 - François-Joseph Passerin - François-Antoine Passerin d'Entrèves
 1714 - François-Joseph Passerin - Claude-Anselme Dunoyer
 1715 - Hiacinte Milloz - Jean-Joseph Zaganaz
 1716-1718 - Jean-Maurice Gérard - Philippe Réan
 1719 - Jacques Ubertin - André Dartaz
 1720 - Octave Cossard - Michel-Joseph Derriard
 1721-1722 - Blaise-Joseph Festaz
 1723-1724 - Jean-Grat Usel - Jean-Barthélemy Varisel
 1725 - Jean-Jacques Squinabol - Jean-Barthélemy Varisel
 1726-1728 - Claude Blanc - Jean-Léonard Vevey
 1729-1731 - Jean-André Carrel - Guillaume Tillier
 1732 - Pierre Savin - Jean-Jacques Bioley
 1733 - Jean-Antoine Gippaz - Étienne Varisel
 1734-1735 - Léonard Favre - Blaise-Hiacinte Derriard
 1736 - Jean-Jacques Thédy - Marc-Antoine Ducrue - Blaise-Hiacinte Derriard
 1737 - Nicolas-Pierre Pussod - Jean-Pantaléon Perret
 1738 - Grat-Joseph Figerod - Jean-Pantaléon Perret
 1739 - Jean-Pierre Favre - Jean-Pantaléon Perret
 1740-1741 - Jean-Pierre Favre - Léonard Ansermin
 1742 - Jean-François Derriard - Léonard Ansermin
 1743 - Joseph-Nicolas Freydoz - Jean-Louis de Tillier
 1744-1745 - Jean-Baptiste Davite - Jean-Baptiste Réan
 1746-1748 - François-Léonard Millet - Jean-François Diernat
 1749-1751 - Albert Bus-Droz
 1752-1753 - Jean-Pierre Bois - André Grivon 
1754 - Jean-Pierre Bois - Blaise-Maurice Tercinod
 1755 - Maxime Pascaz - Blaise-Maurice Tercinod
 1756 - Louis-César Forré - Blaise-Maurice Tercinod
 1757-1758 - Louis-César Forré - Mathieu Vacher
 1759 - Antoine-Sulpice Savin - Mathieu Vacher
 1760-1761 - Antoine-Sulpice Savin - Elzéard Arnod
 1762 - Elzéard Passerin - Elzéard Arnod
 1763-1764 - Elzéard Passerin - Jean-Baptiste Jans
 1765 - Louis Sariod de la Tour de Bard - Jean-Baptiste Jans
 1766-1767 - Louis Sariod de la Tour de Bard - Jean-François Passerin d'Entrèves
 1768 - Joseph Contoz - Jean-Jacques Charles
 1769-1770 - Joseph Savoye - Jean-Jacques Charles
 1771-1773 - Jean-Joseph de Nicolas - Jean-Jacques Rolland
 1774 - Claude-Michel Barillier - Guillaume Champion
 1775 - Grat-Joseph Cocoz - Guillaume Champion
 1776 - Pierre-Joseph Ansermin - Guillaume Champion
 1777 - François-Louis Sariod de la Tour de Bard - Jérôme Dhesia Ducretton
 1778 - Comte de Bard - Grivon
 1779 - Pierre-Joseph Ansermin - Jean-Jacques Charles
 1780 - Comte de Bard - Arbaney
 1781 - Joseph Savoye - Guillaume Champion
 1782-1783 - D'Avise - Rebogliatti
 1784 - Passerin d'Escalier - Francois Gay
 1785 - Comte de Bard - Pierre-Antoine Pesse
 1786 - Comte de Bard - Maurice Revillod
 1787 - Pierre-Joseph Ansermin - Étienne-Joseph Rotaz
 1788 - Jean-Baptiste Jans - Jean-Joseph Troc
 1789 - Jacques Rolland - Joseph Savoye
 1790 - Baron de Charvensod - Guillaume Champion
 1791 - Jean-Léger Bianquin - Tillier
 1792 - Bianquin - Maurice Revillod
 1793 - Pierre-Joseph Ansermin - Jean-Laurent Tercinod
 1794 - Jacques Rolland - Ruffier
 1795 - Jean-Baptste Jans - Laurent Jean
 1796 - Gerbore - Maurice Revillod
 1797 - Baron de Charvensod - Jean-Laurent Tercinod
 1798 - Cantaz - Jean-Baltasar Droz
 1802-1807 - Maurice Revillod
 1808 - Cerise - Jean-Baptiste Réan
 1809-1810 - Jean-Baptiste Réan
 1811-1812 - Cerise
 1813 - Maurice Revillod
 1814 - Louis-Antoine Sariod de la Tour - Jean-Laurent Tercinod
 1815 - Louis-Antoine Sariod de la Tour - Comte de Brissogne
 1816 - Comte de Brissogne - Cognein
 1817 - Jean-Laurent Rebogliatti - Barrillier
 1818 - Claude-François Regis - Pierre-Antoine Pesse
 1819 - Comte de Brissogne - Droz
 1820 - Alby - Pignet
 1821 - Louis de La Tour - Jérôme Savin
 1822 - Jean-Baptiste Réan - Thomas Villot
 1823 - Claude-François Regis - Barmettes
 1824 - Jean-Léger Tercinod - Léandre Galeazzo
 1825 - Vassal - Pierre-Antoine Pesse
 1826 - Empereur - Jérôme Savin
 1827 - De La Pierre - Laurent Derriard
 1828 - Louis de La Tour - Fraucey
 1829 - Chevalier - Pierre-Antoine Pesse
 1830 - Joseph-Octave Donnet - Joseph Gerbore
 1831 - Augustin Vagneur - Maurice Tercinod
 1832 - Defey - Barmettes
 1833 - Boggioz - Léandre Galeazzo
 1834 - Louis de La Tour - Augustin Derriard
 1835 - Augustin Vagneur - Jean-Joseph Pesse
 1836-1837 - Jean-Octave Donnet - Maurice Tercinod
 1838-1839 - Emmanuel Bich - Laurent Argentier
 1840-1841 - Emmanuel Bich
 1842-1844 - Octave-Joseph Donnet
 1845-1846 - Emmanuel Bich
 1847-1848 - Maurice Tercinod
 1849 - Ambroise Vallier
 1850-1851 - Laurent Carlon
 1852-1860 - Bruno Favre

Kingdom of Italy (from 1861 to 1945) 

 1861-1863 - Bruno Favre
 1864-1867 - Rémy Chevalier
 1868 - interrègne
 1869-1872 - Joseph Dalbard
 1873 - interrègne
 1874 - Victor Rosset
 1875-1876 - Laurent Carlon
 1877-1880 - Jules Martinet
 1881-1882 - Vincent Berguet
 1883 - interrègne
 1884-1885 - Vincent Berguet
 1888-1894 - Édouard Erba
 1896-1903 - César Chabloz
 1903 - François Pignet
 1903 - Alessandro Pinelli
 1903-1914 - Julien Charrey
 1914-1917 - Desiré Norat
 1917-1919 - Jean-Joconde Stévenin
 1919-1923 - Jean Farinet
 1923 - Alfredo Bonomo di Castania
 1923 - Mario Trinchero
 1926-1928 - Giuseppe Cajo
 1928-1933 - Giuseppe Fusinaz
 1933-1939 - Giulio Ettore Marcoz
 1939-1943 - Luigi Ramallini
 1943-1944 - Arnaldo Sertoli
 1945-1946 - Carlo Torrione

Italian Republic (since 1946)

City Council election (1946-1995)
From 1946 to 1995, the Mayor of Aosta was elected by the City's Council.

Direct election (since 1995)
Since 1995, under provisions of new local administration law, the Mayor of Aosta is chosen by direct election.

Timeline

References

Bibliography
 

Aosta
 
Politics of Aosta Valley
Aosta